Aleksei Vladimirovich Berezin (born 16 April 1993) is a Russian professional football player.

External links
 Career summary by sportbox.ru
 
 

1993 births
Living people
Footballers from Kazan
Russian footballers
Russia youth international footballers
Association football goalkeepers
Russian expatriate footballers
Expatriate footballers in Poland
Expatriate footballers in Belarus
FC Rubin Kazan players
Widzew Łódź players
FC Arsenal Tula players
FC Dnepr Mogilev players
FC Isloch Minsk Raion players
FC Zenit-Izhevsk players
Belarusian Premier League players